Van Huffel is the surname of:
Albert Van Huffel, Belgian architect of Basilica of the Sacred Heart, Brussels
Chris Van Huffel, American drummer for psychedelic rock band SubArachnoid Space
Danny van Huffel, Dutch footballer for AFC Ajax (amateurs)
Mary-Anne Plaatjies van Huffel, South African pastor and academic
Nick Van Huffel, Belgian footballer for Hoogstraten VV
Sabine Van Huffel, Belgian applied mathematician
Valentin van Huffel, French archer, bronze medalist at the 2007 World Indoor Archery Championships
Wim Van Huffel, Belgian bicycle racer

See also
Van Huffel, fictional police officer in action film Until Death

Surnames of Dutch origin